The Phoenix Fire was an American professional soccer team.

History
Founded in September 1979 as an expansion team ahead of the 1980 American Soccer League season, the team folded in March 1980, during pre-season. The club was one of two expansion teams for 1980, the other being the Golden Gate Gales.

Players
The below is the complete roster for the Phoenix Fire. The team was coached by Jimmy Gabriel.

References

American Soccer League (1933–1983) teams
Defunct soccer clubs in Arizona
Association football clubs established in 1979
Association football clubs disestablished in 1980